Lincoln Park is a census-designated place (CDP) located in and governed by Fremont County, Colorado, United States. The CDP is a part of the Cañon City, CO Micropolitan Statistical Area. The population of the Lincoln Park CDP was 3,546 at the United States Census 2010. The Cañon City post office (Zip Code 81212) serves the area.

Geography
Lincoln Park is located in eastern Fremont County. It is bordered to the north and west by Cañon City, the county seat, and to the southeast by Brookside.

The former incorporated town of Prospect Heights now lies within the Lincoln Park CDP.

Demographics

Environmental issues

In 1958, Cotter Corporation, a company owned by Commonwealth Edison of Chicago, began to process uranium ore in Cañon City. In the process of mining uranium ore, the company contaminated the surrounding land, and compromised the water supply of nearby Lincoln Park,  from ADX Florence. In a class-action lawsuit filed by 340 people, the company was accused of lowering nearby land values due to radioactive contamination both at the site of the mill and along the Santa Fe Railway. In 1983, the state of Colorado sued over these damages to the environment; settling for $15 million, Cotter Corporation promised to clean up the mill site. The company resumed work in 1999, but laid off the majority of employees in 2005 after it was determined that shipping ore from Colorado's Western Slope was cost-prohibitive. The water contamination in Lincoln Park remains, and the area has been declared a Superfund site.

See also

 List of census-designated places in Colorado

References

External links

 Fremont County website

Census-designated places in Fremont County, Colorado
Census-designated places in Colorado
Colorado populated places on the Arkansas River